The Rochester Knighthawks were a lacrosse team based in Rochester, New York, that played in the National Lacrosse League (NLL). The 2012 season was the 18th in franchise history. After a 7-9 season, the Knighthawks came on strong in the playoffs and won their third NLL Championship, defeating the Edmonton Rush 9-6.

Regular season

Conference standings

Game log
Reference:

Playoffs
Reference:

Transactions

Trades

Dispersal Draft
The Knighthawks chose the following players in the Boston Blazers dispersal draft:

Entry draft
The 2011 NLL Entry Draft took place on September 21, 2011. The Knighthawks selected the following players:

Roster

See also
2012 NLL season

References

Rochester Knighthawks seasons
2012 in lacrosse
Rochester Knighthawks